Janet Zebedayo Mbene (born 14 June 1952) is a Tanzanian CCM politician and a nominated member of parliament. She was the Deputy Minister of Industry, Trade and Marketing.

References

1952 births
Living people
Chama Cha Mapinduzi MPs
Tanzanian MPs 2010–2015
Nominated Tanzanian MPs
Deputy government ministers of Tanzania
Institute of Finance Management alumni
University of Dar es Salaam alumni
University of New England (Australia) alumni